Racing FBC (sometimes referred as Racing de Huancavelica) is a Peruvian football club, playing in the city of Huancavelica, Peru.

History
The Racing FBC was founded on April 8, 1942.

In 1994 Copa Perú, the club classified to the Regional Stage, but was eliminated in the Group Stage 

In the 2013 Copa Perú, the club classified to the Regional Stage, but was eliminated by San Ignacio in the Group Stage.

In the 2015 Copa Perú, the club classified to the National Stage, but was eliminated when finished in 6th place.

Honours

Regional
Liga Departamental de Huancavelica:
Winners (2): 1991, 1994
Runner-up (2): 2013, 2015

Liga Provincial de Huancavelica:
Winners (7): 1942, 1943, 1944, 1957, 2011, 2013, 2014
Runner-up (1): 2015

Liga Distrital de Huancavelica:
Winners (1): 2013
Runner-up (4): 2011, 2014, 2015, 2016

See also
List of football clubs in Peru
Peruvian football league system

References

External links

Football clubs in Peru
Association football clubs established in 1942